A list of films produced by the Marathi language film industry based in Maharashtra in the year 2007.

January–March

April–June

July–September

October–December

Date unknown 
A list of Marathi films released in 2007.

References

Lists of 2007 films by country or language
2007
2007 in Indian cinema